Moultrie may refer to:

 Moultrie (name)
 Moultrie, Georgia, a town
 Moultrie, Ohio, an unincorporated community
 Moultrie County, Illinois
 Fort Moultrie, a series of citadels on Sullivan's Island, South Carolina, built to protect the city of Charleston